Chapdar (also Romanized as Chabdar; also known as Choghābdār and Choqāb Dār) is a village in Darreh Seydi Rural District, in the Central District of Borujerd County, Lorestan Province, Iran. At the 2006 census, its population was 72, in 15 families.

References 

Towns and villages in Borujerd County